Karen Kashmanian Oates is an American biochemist and academic. She is Peterson Family Dean of Arts and Sciences at Worcester Polytechnic Institute. In 2011, she was named a Fellow of the American Association for the Advancement of Science.

Life 
She graduated from  Worcester Polytechnic Institute and George Washington University. 

She worked at  George Mason University, Harrisburg University of Science and Technology and the  National Science Foundation.

Works

References 

American women biochemists
Living people
Year of birth missing (living people)
Worcester Polytechnic Institute alumni
American university and college faculty deans
George Washington University alumni